William S. McEllroy (September 22, 1893 in Pittsburgh, Pennsylvania – January 2, 1981 in State College, Pennsylvania) was a tennis player in the early part of the 20th century.

A member of the University of Pittsburgh's tennis team, he served as coach of its tennis team in the 1920s and 1930s. He also obtained a medical degree from the University of Pittsburgh and later served as Dean of the University of Pittsburgh School of Medicine.

At the tournament in Cincinnati, Ohio, McEllroy won the singles title in 1913 and 1914 and the doubles title in 1913 (with Joseph J. Armstrong) and was the singles runner-up in 1915 (falling to future International Tennis Hall of Fame inductee Clarence Griffin.)

Other Notable Results:
Singles finalist (likely): 1912 Canadian National Championships
Singles champion: 1915 New York State Championships; 1915 Ohio State Championships
Singles semifinalist: 1926 Ohio State Championships
Doubles champion: 1915 New York State Championships
Doubles runner-up: 1915 Ohio State Championships
Mixed Doubles champion: 1915 Ohio State Championships

References

1893 births
1981 deaths
American male tennis players
Pittsburgh Panthers men's tennis players
Tennis players from Pittsburgh